V Love, formerly known as Love In The Micro Era·First Love is a 2014 Chinese television series directed by Liu Yuzhi and written by Chen Baohua, starring Gao Weiguang, Zhang Binbin, Zhang Yunlong, Dilraba Dilmurat, Xiao Yuyu, Li Xirui, Bian Yu, and Yang Chengcheng. It exclusively aired in Tencent Video as a web drama on 21 July 2014 until 11 September 2014 every Mondays-Fridays at 12:00.

Plot
A story about revolving around eight youths of the post 90s-generation (SNS generation) who come from different family backgrounds and experienced a complex relationship at the Bohan University. They are about to graduate while enjoying their life in the Internet age and facing challenges to finding happiness as they finish university and move on into their own world in the luxurious city of China, Shanghai.

Cast

Main
Vengo Gao as Ying Dong / Kaiser
Heir of a large luxury goods conglomerate who holds a supreme status in the Bohan University. He firstly dates his first love, Luo Yi during their college day before later broke up after the graduation. He becomes close with Wan Jia, but later with Anpo due to Wan Jia's identity disparity and his father's opposition.
Vin Zhang as Han Dingyi
Boss of a flower shop invested by Ying Dong who firstly likes Wan Jia, but later found out that he falls in love with Weiwei after an incident.
Leon Zhang as Hua Youxi
Dingyi's half brother and Mei Bao's boyfriend who truly loves her after the false pregnancy incident.
Dilraba Dilmurat as Wu Anpo / Amber
The most popular girl on Bohan University since she's the only daughter of Shanghai Hotel chain tycoon. She firstly likes Zirui, but later breaks up after realizing that she loves Yingdong and dates him.
Rainie Chen as Wan Jia, an arts student and Ying Dong's ex-girlfriend.
Sierra Li as Kang Weiwei (a.k.a Mister Kang)
Wan Jia's bestfriend who is known for her straightforward and tough personality. She likes Dingyi to be with her but eventually breaks up because of Wan Jia.
Bian Yu as Kang Zirui
A director and Weiwei's older brother who likes and pursues Luo Yi at first before later dates Anpo. They eventually broke up due to misunderstanding between them.
Orange Yang as Mei Bao
Captain of the cheerleader team who becomes a part-time worker at a bar. She later falls in love with Youxi and hopes to be his girlfriend after the false pregnancy incident.

Supporting
Sitar Tan as Ai Di / Eddie, an "Ugly Duckling" who transform into an established singer and become Dingyi's first love.
Bibi Zhou as Ye Feifei, an entertainment news reporter and the "Gossip Queen".
Monica Chan as Gao Qi, Anpo's mother.
Kim Bum as Ou Hui
Owner of Auva Group who is also a wealthy yet arrogant restauranteur. Despite his strong and confident personality, he rarely gets along with everyone due to his perfectionist tendencies before later meets Weiwei and falls for her.
Lawrence Wang as Teacher Lan, a teacher at Bohan University.
Zhang Zixuan as Ding Xiaorou / Sunnie, Sanmao's first love.
Hou Guanqun as Wu Yuting, Anpo's father and a chain of Shanghai Hotel Tycoon.
Yu Li as Hua Mengjun, Youxi and Dingyi's mother.
Zheng Xiaoning as Wan Fu, Wan Jia's father.
Yuan Jia as Wei Chi, Yuting's secretary.
Wang Xiao as Lan Tian, a teacher and Mengjun's good friend.
Xu Fangyi as Ou Yangqiao, a girl who likes Wei Chi.
Yao Lu as Ying Youjin, Ying Dong's father.
Wang Zhifei as Han Xuewei
Yuan Jie as Wei Te

Special appearances
Yang Mi as Luo Yi, a huge superstar and Ying Dong's first love (Ep. 1–2, 38–40)
Shawn Yue as Hua Sanmao, a Teppanyaki chef who is known for his good looks and is Youxi and Dingyi's uncle (Ep. 1–9)

Production
This is South Korean actor Kim Bum's first Chinese drama.
Beside playing the role as "Luo Yi", actress Yang Mi also become the producer which later established "V Studio" by herself to specially responsible for the costume styling.
This series started filming in Bali, Indonesia on 21 February 2013 and took the palace at Shanghai, China in early March until 27 May in the same year.

Original soundtrack

Broadcast

Others
Many sources pointed out that this series is a Chinese version of the 2007-12 American series Gossip Girl.

References

External links
V Love on IMDb .
V Love on Weibo .
V Love on Tencent Video .
V Love on Douban .
V Love on iQIYI .

2014 Chinese television series debuts
Chinese romantic comedy television series
Chinese romance television series
2014 Chinese television series endings
Television series by H&R Century Pictures
Television series by Jay Walk Studio
Television series by Tencent Penguin Pictures
Television shows filmed in Shanghai